Tashiding Gewog is a gewog (sub district) of Dagana District, Bhutan. It also comprises part of Dagapela Dungkhag (sub-district), along with Dorona and Goshi Gewogs.

Notable residents 
 Namgay Peldon, judge and politician serving as Gup, or administrator

References

Gewogs of Bhutan
Dagana District